Louisa Pitt (1754/56–1791) was the second daughter of the British diplomat and politician George Pitt, 1st Baron Rivers (1721–1803), and his wife, Penelope Atkins.

Pitt was born in 1754 (or 1756) in Stratfield Saye, Southampton, Hampshire, England. She married Sir Peter Beckford (1740–1811) on 22 March 1773 in Dorset. Sir Peter Beckford was a writer, a huntsman, and the cousin of the English novelist William Thomas Beckford (1760–1844), author of the famous Gothic novel Vathek. They had several children, of whom the surviving son became the 3rd Baron Rivers, succeeding his maternal uncle and maternal grandfather by special remainder.

After her marriage, Louisa Beckford had an affair with her husband's cousin William Beckford; at one point, totally smitten and desperate to regain his attention, she offered to participate in a ménage à trois at an infamous house party at Fonthill. She died of tuberculosis in 1791 in Florence and was buried in the Old English Cemetery in Livorno, Italy.

References

External links 
Liverpoolmuseums.org.uk 
Classicartrepro.com

1754 births
1791 deaths
18th-century deaths from tuberculosis
18th-century English nobility
18th-century English women
Louisa
Daughters of barons
Tuberculosis deaths in Italy
People from Southampton
Pitt family
Infectious disease deaths in Tuscany